Alessio Buttaro (born 10 September 2002) is an Italian professional footballer who plays as a defender for Palermo.

Club career 
A Roma youth product, Buttaro was signed permanently by Serie C club Palermo on 14 July 2021, with a buy-back option in favour of the Giallorossi.

Originally a centre defender, Buttaro switched to a right back position by the end of the 2021–22 Serie C season under head coach Silvio Baldini, being a regular in the Rosanero lineup that won the promotion playoffs.

Career statistics

Club

References

2002 births
Living people
Italian footballers
Footballers from Rome
Association football defenders
Palermo F.C. players
Serie B players
Serie C players